The Hitchhiker is a 2007 American thriller film written and directed by Leigh Scott, and co-written by Jeshua De Horta.

Plot
While travelling through Utah, Jack Carter picks up a hitchhiker, but kicks him out after a few minutes due to the man hitting on him. Hours later, Jack stops in a secluded area, and begins digging a grave for the woman he had bound and gagged in the back of his pickup truck.

Four women (Melinda, Patty, Kristina, and Denise) from Colorado Springs are driving through the area on their way to a nurse's conference in Las Vegas. Spotting Jack hitchhiking, the quartet pick him up, and soon after experience car trouble, forcing them to stop at a roadside motel. The manager tells the group that the nearest service station does not open until the morning, so they elect to stay. During the night, Jack shows interest in Melinda, and has rough sex with Kristina, who has a fiancé.

In the morning, the mechanic arrives, and is shot to death by Jack after the two travel to Jack's abandoned truck. Jack returns to the motel, where he murders the manager and takes the women captive after drugging them. Jack gives a misogynistic speech, and implies he is doing this due to having been "betrayed" by his girlfriend or wife. While sexually assaulting Denise and Melinda, Jack is knocked out by the latter, who tries to escape with her friends. The vehicles will either not work, or are missing their keys, so the women decide to kill Jack, who awakens while being attacked, and fatally shoots Kristina. The others are recaptured, and while Jack is binding Melinda (who he has developed a fondness for, and regards as "special") a married couple arrives, looking for a room.

After giving the couple a room, Jack kills the husband when he goes to investigate noises coming from the room Melinda and the others are in. Jack places the man's wife, Susan, with the other captives, and shoots Patty in the head after Denise goes on an insult-laden rant against him. As Jack sleeps, Susan uses her cellphone to repeatedly dial 911, prompting a pair of police officers to stop by in the morning. Jack gets into a shootout with the officers, who he kills while Melinda, Denise, and Susan drive off in their patrol car. A chase ensues, during which Susan is shot in the head, and Jack is run over.

Weeks later, Denise visits Melinda, and it is revealed that Jack had survived, and is being tried in Wyoming, where he murdered at least two women. That night, Jack, who had escaped from custody and hitchhiked his way to Colorado, breaks into Melinda's home, and ties her husband to a chair. Jack declares his love for Melinda, who responds by rejecting him, shooting him in the stomach, and then in the face.

Cast
 Jeff Denton as Jack Carter
 Sarah Lieving as Melinda Mann
 Shaley Scott as Denise
 Sarah Hall as Patty
 Jessica Bork as Kristina
 Alexandra Boylan as Jennifer
 Griff Furst as Paul Mann
 James Ferris as Steve
 Dane Hanson as Felix
 David Shick as Officer Jenkins
 Michael Tower as Officer Ferrati
 Leigh Scott as Doug
 Dean Arevalo as Cliff
 Erica Roby as Lindsey

Reception

Arrow in the Head gave The Hitchhiker a two and half out of four, describing it as "a perfectly decent little flick" and going on to say that "For a direct-to-DVD knock-off, it's always watchable and mostly engaging. You could do worse than dropping a few bucks down for this, but don't expect to be too surprised or scared by the assembly line plot". Beyond Hollywood said it was "not altogether bad" and that it moves well enough, "with plenty of gratuitous sex, violence, and exploitative moments" to warrant a viewing for those interested in the genre.

Felix Vasquez Jr. of Film Threat panned the movie, writing that the movie was "definite proof that all Leigh Scott had to do to ensure he'd inflict a cruel revenge on me was to make another movie".

References

External links
 

2007 films
2000s English-language films
2007 direct-to-video films
2007 independent films
2007 psychological thriller films
2000s road movies
American female buddy films
American independent films
American psychological thriller films
American road movies
The Asylum films
Films directed by Leigh Scott
Films set in 2006
Films set in 2007
Films set in Colorado
Films set in hotels
Films set in Utah
Films shot in California
Films about hitchhiking
American rape and revenge films
American serial killer films
2000s American films